The Australian PlantBank is a seed bank located in the Australian Botanic Gardens, Mount Annan. The seedbank is part of the Millennium Seed Bank Project. The SeedBank replaced the former NSW Seedbank as part of an upgrade.

History 

The former NSW Seedbank was established in 1986 and originally collected wild seed for the Gardens. The former seedbank went through an extensive upgrade in 1999 and ensured that the seeds were of high quality. The biggest and latest update was in 2013, where the NSW Seedbank turned into the Australian PlantBank.

In 2014 the new building, designed by BVN, received the Public Architecture: National Award from the Australian Institute of Architects.

Opening ceremony 

The opening ceremony for the Australian PlantBank was held on 11 October 2013. The seedbank was officially opened by Her Excellency Professor Marie Bashir. Other attendees included:

The Honourable Robyn Parker MP, Minister for Environment and Heritage
Mr Ken Boundy, Chair, Royal Botanic Gardens and Domain Trust

References

External links 
PlantBank opening ceremony official party + gallery

Community seed banks
Gene banks
Nature conservation in New South Wales
1986 establishments in Australia
Buildings and structures completed in 2013
Buildings and structures in New South Wales
Agricultural organisations based in Australia